What If is an album by former Styx guitarist Tommy Shaw, released in 1985. It was his second solo release. The album received somewhat favorable reviews. The album peaked at #87 on the Billboard 200.

The album is named after the track "Remo's Theme (What If)", which is the theme song for the character Remo Williams in the movie Remo Williams: The Adventure Begins. The song was not released on a soundtrack and was first made available on What If.

Track listing
All words and music by Tommy Shaw, except as indicated. The track "Friendly Advice" was moved to the end for the reissue.

 "Jealousy" - 4:43
 "Remo's Theme (What If)" (Shaw, Richie Cannata) - 4:23
 "Reach for the Bottle" - 5:44
 "Friendly Advice" - 3:29
 "This Is Not a Test" - 3:26
 "See Me Now" - 3:45
 "True Confessions" (Shaw, Cannata) - 3:27
 "Count on You" - 6:09
 "Nature of the Beast" - 4:04
 "Bad Times" - 2:44

Personnel
Tommy Shaw: Guitars, Keyboards, Lead Vocals, Background Vocals
Richie Cannata: Saxophone, Keyboards
Brian Stanley: Bass Guitar
Steve Holley: Drums, Percussion
Mark Marshall: Drums on "Bad Times"
Gary Myrick: Electric Guitar on "Count On You" and "Friendly Advice"

References

1986 albums
Tommy Shaw albums
A&M Records albums